Elumalai is a Panchayat town in the district of Madurai, in the Indian state of Tamil Nadu. Originally named Aezhumalai (Seven Hills), the town is located near Usilampatti (18 km), Madurai (58 km), Theni (56 km),  Peraiyur (24 km) and Tirumangalam (40 km) in the Western ghats. 

The city is surrounded by mountains on all four sides. The Vasimalai Kannan Temple is located on the Vasimalai Hill on the north, Sathuragiri on the south, Mavoortru Velappar Hill on the west, Vasimalai (Kudirai Giri) on the north and Didiyan Hill on the east.  Sundaramakalingam and Santhana Mahalingam are located in Sathuragiri on the south and Mavootru Velappar (Murugan) temple is located on the west hill.

Geography

The town is surrounded by seven hills and is famous for Sathuragiri Hill close to Saptur. The  Seven hills (EZhilmigu Elumalai) provide an abundant variety of flora. In addition, the Elumalai Vasimalayan mountain serves as a boundary between the Madurai and Theni districts.

Religion 
It has religious sites, temple, mosque and church.

Demographics
As of the 2001 India census, Elumalai had a population of 14,030. Males constitute 50% of the population and females 50%. 10% of the population are under 6 years of age. Elumalai has an average literacy rate of 56%, which is lower than the national average of 59.5%. Male literacy is 67% and female literacy is 45%.

Festivals
Chithirai 01, Mavootru Velappar (Murugan) temple, Chittara Pournami Madurai Chithirai thiruvizha Kallazhagar grand entry into Vaigai River.  and, Sri Pettai Bhadrakaliamman and Sri Santhanamariamman temple festivals in Vaikasi, Audi Amavasai Sundara Mahalingam, The month of Purattasi is the auspicious month for Vasimalayan. Purattasi (September) sees the celebration of the Vasimalayan festival.

Politics
It is part of the Madurai (Lok Sabha constituency). S. Venkatesan also known as  Su. Venkatesan from CPI(M) is the Member of Parliament, Lok Sabha, after his election in the 2019 Indian general election.

Education
The government runs a boys and girls school. A private high school operates there. The Bharathiyar Matric Higher Secondary School, Shri vishwa vidhyalaya primary school . In addition,  many primary schools serve the town and surrounding villages. Thiruvalluvar Group of Institutions are Situated near by 4km in Soolapuram/Mallapuram

Famous personalities 
Tamil film personality Kalaignanam, who is a writer, director, producer, actor and lyricist was born in 1930 in Elumalai.

Airports
 Madurai Airport (57.4 km)
 Tuticorin Airport (130 km)
 Cochin Intl Airport (150 km)
 Coimbatore Airport (225 km)
 Tiruchirappalli Airport (150 km)

References

Cities and towns in Madurai district